The 2014–15 Russian Handball Superliga is the 23rd season of the Super League, Russian premier Handball league.

Team information 

The following 10 clubs compete in the Super League during the 2014–15 season:

Regular season

Standings

Pld - Played; W - Won; D - Drawn; L - Lost; GF - Goals for; GA - Goals against; Diff - Difference; Pts - Points.

Schedule and results
In the table below the home teams are listed on the left and the away teams along the top.

References

External links
 Russian Handball Federaration 

2014–15 domestic handball leagues
Super League
Super League